Henry IV of France was the first Bourbon king of France. Formerly known as Henri of Navarre, he succeeded to the French throne with the extinction of House of Valois, at the death of Henry III of France. 

His descendants are varied and numerous. Some of his descendants are Juan Carlos of Spain, Franz, Duke of Bavaria, Diana, Princess of Wales, actress Brooke Shields and singer and actress Jane Birkin. He had six children with his wife Marie de' Medici and also had at least eleven illegitimate children with his many mistresses. This article deals with each of his legitimate children and their respective descendants.

Life, background and pedigree

Life and claim to the French Throne

Henri de Bourbon was born in Pau, the capital of the French province of Béarn. Although baptised as a Roman Catholic, Henry was raised as a Protestant by his mother Jeanne d’Albret. On 9 June 1572, upon Jeanne's death, he became King Henry III of Navarre.

When Henry was a boy, it seemed highly unlikely that he would ever inherit the throne of France, since Henry II had produced four surviving sons. However, his male-line pedigree gave him a special place of honour in the French nobility, since all sons of the Bourbon line were acknowledged as the princes of the blood. As the senior male representative of that line, Henry was officially the First Prince of the Blood.

Henry of Navarre became the legal heir to the French throne upon the death in 1584 of François, Duke of Alençon, brother and heir presumptive of the Catholic King Henry III. Because of Henry's status as the Prince du Sang, Henry III had no choice but to recognise him as the legitimate successor. The Salic law disinherited the king's sisters and all others who could claim descent by the distaff line.  He was then the closest relative of the king in the legitimate male line, and as such the next senior-most representative of the House of Capet after the king himself. Catherine de Medici, the King's mother, had attempted to unite Valois and Bourbon interests. In 1572, by which time only two of her sons remained alive, she brokered a marriage between her daughter Marguerite of Valois and Henry. 

On the death of Henry III on 2 August 1589, Henri of Navarre nominally became the King of France. But the powerful Catholic League, strengthened by support from Spain, forced him to the south and he had to set about winning his kingdom by military conquest, aided by money and troops bestowed by Protestant England. This set off the War of the Three Henries phase of the French Wars of Religion. The League proclaimed Henry's Catholic uncle Charles, the Cardinal de Bourbon, king as Charles X, but the Cardinal himself was Henry's prisoner. Henry was victorious at Ivry and Arques, but failed to take Paris.

With the encouragement of the great love of his life, Gabrielle d'Estrées, on 25 July 1593 Henry declared that Paris vaut bien une messe ("Paris is well worth a mass") and permanently renounced Protestantism, thus earning him the allegiance of the vast majority of his subjects and the resentment of his former allies. He was crowned King of France at the Cathedral of Chartres on 27 February 1594. In 1598, he declared the Edict of Nantes, which gave circumscribed toleration to the Huguenots. However, this action angered fanatical Catholics, who wanted Protestantism rooted out for good, and could see that Henry had no intention to do so. Therefore, in 1610, Henry was assassinated by a fanatical Catholic, François Ravaillac.

Pedigree

Maternal ancestry

Paternal ancestry

King Louis IX (Saint Louis) (1214/1215 – 1270)
Robert, Count of Clermont (1256–1317), brother of King Philip III
Louis I, Duke of Bourbon (1279–1342), 1st cousin of King Philip IV
James I, Count of La Marche (1315–1362), 2nd cousin of kings Louis X, Philip V, Charles IV, and Philip VI
John I, Count of La Marche (1344–1393), 3rd cousin of kings John I Posthumus and John II
Louis, Count of Vendôme (1376–1446), 4th cousin of King Charles V
François, Count of Vendôme (1470–1495), 6th cousin of King Charles VII
Charles IV, Duke of Bourbon (1489–1537), 7th cousin of kings Louis XI and Louis XII
Antoine de Bourbon (1518–1562), 8th cousin of kings Charles VIII and Francis I
Henry IV was the 9th cousin of King Henry II, and the 9th cousin once removed of kings Francis II, Charles IX, and Henry III

Legitimate issue by Marie de' Medici

Children

Descendants of Louis XIII of France

Senior agnatic descendants Louis XIV of France

Senior agnatic descendants of Philippe I, Duke of Orleans

Descendants of Elisabeth of France

Descendants of Christine of France

Descendants of Henrietta Maria of France

Descendants of Gaston d'Orléans

See also
House of Bourbon
Marie de' Medici
House of Medici
House of Stuart
Descendants of Louis XIV of France
Descendants of Philippe I, Duke of Orléans
Descendants of Philip V of Spain
Descendants of Charles III of Spain

References

External links

Rubens cycle of paintings apotheosizing Marie de' Medici Definitive statements of Baroque art.
Maritime Museum
 Drawing by Claes Cornelisz. Moeyaert the entrance of Maria de Medici in Amsterdam
Festival Books

Descendants
House of Bourbon
House of Medici
Henry 04 of France